Brat Pack were a group of young actors in the 1980s.

Brat Pack may also refer to:

 Brat Pack (literary), a group of young authors in the 1980s
 Brat Pack (comics), a limited series of comic books by Rick Veitch
 The Brat Pack (duo), an American vocal duo
 "Brat Pack", a song by The Rocket Summer from Hello, Good Friend